Onnum Onnum Moonu is an Indian celebrity talk show  hosted by singer Rimy Tomy on Mazhavil Manorama. The first season of the show began airing on 7 the April 2013 and has completed four seasons.

Onnum Onnum Moonu is all based on a fun-talk show being aired on Mazhavil Manorama. The show opens with a song sung by Tomy, and usually closes with a song sung by her along with the guests. The show consists of several talks, mainly about celebrities' upcoming films. It consist of several segments like Rapid Fire, Opinions, Quiz Round, and Tongue Twister in which the winner is given a prize from the show's sponsor. The program combines comedy, celebrity, musical guests and stories from both Tomy and the guests. The program later began to feature audience participation games where prizes are awarded.

The show had once broadcast an episode featuring the Bollywood actor Shah Rukh Khan and actress Deepika Padukone for the promotion of their film Happy New Year. The entire episode were taken at Mumbai.

Season(s)

List of episodes

Season 4
The 4th season of Onnum Onnum Moonu began telecasting since 17 November 2019.

Season 3
Onnum Onnum Moonu season 2 was abruptly stopped in February 2018 and after a gap of 6 months the show relaunched in a new format with chit chat and game sessions.

Season 2
Onnum onnum moonu ran for 3 years in Manorama channel was abruptly stopped in mid 2016. With a few changes the channel relaunched the show as 'Chemmanur gold onnum onnum moonu season 2' with Rimi Tomy as the Host along with the orchestra members.

Season 1

References

External links 
 Official Website

Indian television talk shows
Malayalam-language television shows
2013 Indian television series debuts
Mazhavil Manorama original programming